Merricks Beach is a small seaside village on the Mornington Peninsula in Melbourne Victoria, Australia, approximately  south-east of Melbourne's Central Business District, located within the Shire of Mornington Peninsula local government area. Merricks Beach recorded a population of 157 at the 2021 census.

Merricks Beach is located on the eastern side of the peninsula on Western Port Bay.

See also
 Shire of Hastings – Merricks Beach was previously within this former local government area.

References

Mornington Peninsula
Western Port
Coastal towns in Victoria (Australia)